{{Speciesbox
|image = 
|genus = Quercus
|display_parents = 2
|parent = Quercus sect. Cyclobalanopsis
|species = brevicalyx
|authority = A.Camus
|synonyms = 
Cyclobalanopsis yingjiangensis Y.C.Hsu & Q.Z.Dong
Quercus yingjiangensis (Y.C.Hsu & Q.Z.Dong)Govaerts
|synonyms_ref = 
}}Quercus brevicalyx, synonym Quercus yingjiangensis, is an uncommon Asian species of tree in the beech family Fagaceae. It is found in southwestern China in the Province of Yunnan and in Laos.Flora of China, Cyclobalanopsis yingjiangensis Y. C. Hsu & Q. Z. Dong in Y. C. Hsu & B. S. Sun, 1983.  盈江青冈 ying jiang qing gang Quercus brevicalyx'' is a tree up to 20 meters tall. Twigs are dark purple. Leaves can be as much as 12 cm long.

References

brevicalyx
Flora of Yunnan
Flora of Laos
Trees of China
Plants described in 1983